A partial solar eclipse will occur on April 1, 2098. A solar eclipse occurs when the Moon passes between Earth and the Sun, thereby totally or partly obscuring the image of the Sun for a viewer on Earth. A partial solar eclipse occurs in the polar regions of the Earth when the center of the Moon's shadow misses the Earth.

Related eclipses

Solar eclipses 2098–2100

References

External links

2098 04 01
Solar eclipse 2098 04 1
2098 4 1
2098 4 1